Ocoliș may refer to the following places in Romania:

Ocoliș, a commune in Alba County
Ocoliș, a village in the commune Groși, Maramureș County
Ocoliș (Arieș), a tributary of the Arieș in Alba County
Ocoliș, a tributary of the Valea Luncanilor in Hunedoara County